Chaetosiphon fragaefolii, the strawberry aphid, is a bug species in the genus Chaetosiphon found in the United States (Arizona), Argentina and Chile.

C. fragaefolii, along with C. thomasi and C. thomasi jacobi, is a vector of the strawberry mild yellow-edge virus.

References

External links 

 uniprot.org/taxonomy
 discoverlife.org
 
 gbif.org
 invasive.org

Macrosiphini
Insects described in 1901
Insect vectors of plant pathogens
Insects of the United States
Fauna of Argentina
Fauna of Chile
Insects of South America